Giuseppe Giacosa (21 October, 1847 – 1 September, 1906) was an Italian poet, playwright and librettist.

Life
He was born in Colleretto Parella, now Colleretto Giacosa, near Turin. His father was a magistrate. Giuseppe went to the University of Turin, studying in the University of Turin, Faculty of Law.  Though he gained a degree in law, he did not pursue a legal career.

He gained initial fame for his play Una Partita a Scacchi ("A Game of Chess") in 1871. His main field was playwriting, which he accomplished with both insight and simplicity, using subjects set in Piedmont and themes addressing contemporary bourgeois values. He wrote La signora di Challant (La Dame de Challant, The Lady of Challand), based on a novella by Matteo Bandello, for noted French actress Sarah Bernhardt, produced in New York in 1891.

Giacosa wrote the final polished version of the libretto for Giacomo Puccini's Manon Lescaut, which had been begun by Ruggero Leoncavallo, Marco Praga,  Domenico Oliva, and Luigi Illica. He also wrote the librettos used by Puccini for La bohème, Tosca and Madama Butterfly in conjunction with Luigi Illica. Illica supplied the plot and dialogue, and Giacosa polished the libretto into verses. Also well as the one Act play of The rights of the soul".

See also
 Scapigliatura

External links 

 
 
 

1847 births
1906 deaths
Italian dramatists and playwrights
Italian poets
Italian male poets
Italian opera librettists
Writers from Turin
University of Turin alumni
Italian male dramatists and playwrights
19th-century poets
19th-century Italian dramatists and playwrights
19th-century Italian male writers
People from Colleretto Giacosa